The Dallas County Hospital District, doing business as the Parkland Health & Hospital System, is the hospital district of Dallas County, Texas, United States. Its headquarters are in the Parkland Memorial Hospital in Dallas.

Parkland Health provides medical care to indigent patients in Dallas County. 

Parkland Memorial Hospital is the primary hospital of the district.

History
In 2009 the Greater Dallas Planning Council awarded the Dream Study Award to the district due to the district's master plan for its hospital. In 2009 Parkland Health & Hospital system began analyzing electronic medical records in order to use predictive modeling to help identify patients at high risk of hospital readmission. Initially the hospital focused on patients with congestive heart failure, but the program has expanded to include patients with diabetes, acute myocardial infarction, and pneumonia.

Community clinics
The district operates several community clinics. The locations elsewhere are:
Bluitt-Flowers Health Center (Dallas)
deHaro-Saldivar Health Center (Dallas)
Employee Physician Office (Dallas)
East Dallas Health Center (Dallas)
Garland Health Center (Garland)
Irving Health Center (Irving)
Oak West Health Center (Dallas)
Parkland Memorial Hospital (Dallas)
Pediatric Primary Care Center (Dallas)
E. Carlyle Smith, Jr. Health Center (Grand Prairie)
Southeast Dallas Health Center (Dallas)
Vickery Health Center (Dallas) - In Vickery Meadow

Youth and family centers
The district has several youth and family centers in area schools.
 Dallas Independent School District
Amelia Flores Youth & Family Health Center - Bryan Adams High School
Eddie Bernice Johnson Youth & Family Health Center - Lincoln High School
Fair Oaks Youth & Family Health Center - Conrad High School
Kiosco Youth & Family Health Center - Cary Middle School
North Oak Cliff Youth & Family Health Center - Greiner Middle School
Red Bird Youth & Family Health Center - T.W. Browne Middle School
Seagoville Youth & Family Health Center - Seagoville
Spruce Youth & Family Health Center - Spruce High School
West Dallas Youth & Family Health Center - Pinkston High School
Woodrow Youth & Family Health Center - Woodrow Wilson High School/J.L. Long Middle School
 Carrollton-Farmers Branch Independent School District
 Vivian Field Youth & Family Health Center - Vivian Field Elementary School (Farmers Branch)

See also

 Harris Health System (former Harris County Hospital District)
 JPS Health Network (Tarrant County)

References

External links
 Parkland Health & Hospital System

Hospital networks in the United States
Dallas County, Texas
Healthcare in Dallas
Buildings and structures in Dallas County, Texas
Medical and health organizations based in Texas
Health departments in Texas